Ontisalaga Madakari Nayaka or Madakari Nayaka V or Karigundi Nayaka (1742 - 1782) was the last Nayaka ruler of Chitradurga, India. He belongs to Bedar Nayaka caste and is considered to be the greatest of the Nayakas of Chitradurga and also Sirsi and Karigundi. He ruled from 1754 to 1779. He also gained the title of Eppatelu Palegarara Ganda/Minda (Superior ruler over 77 palegaras) by Peshwa Madhavrao I after he helped him win the Nidagallu Fort.

In fiction
 Durgaastamana by T. R. Subba Rao is a semi-historical novel based on the life of Madakari Nayaka. It won the Sahitya Akademi award posthumously in 1985
 Gandugali Madakari Nayaka by B. L. Venu is another semi-fictionalised book detailing the life of Madakari Nayaka.

References

Indian royalty
People from Chitradurga
1758 births
1779 deaths
History of Karnataka